Beaumont is a historic home located near Michaux, Powhatan County, Virginia. It consists of a two-story, five-bay, central-passage frame structure built in 1811, with a two-story rear brick addition built about 1839. The front facade features a two-tier portico. The main block has a gable roof and exterior end chimneys. The property was acquired in 1937 by "Beaumont Farms" as a reform school for boys. The property is under the jurisdiction of the Virginia Department of Corrections and serves as the Beaumont Learning Center.

It was added to the National Register of Historic Places in 1986.

References

Houses on the National Register of Historic Places in Virginia
Houses completed in 1811
Houses in Powhatan County, Virginia
National Register of Historic Places in Powhatan County, Virginia